Urceola is a plant genus in the family Apocynaceae, first described as a genus in 1798. It is native to China, the Himalayas, Southeast Asia, and New Guinea.

Species
 Urceola brachysepala Hook.f. - Borneo, Java, W Malaysia, Sumatra, Philippines 
 Urceola elastica Roxb. - Borneo, Java, W Malaysia, Sumatra
 Urceola huaitingii (Chun & Tsiang) Mabb. - Guizhou, Guangdong, Guangxi, Hainan
 Urceola javanica (Blume) Boerl. - Borneo, Java, Maluku, Sumatra, Sulawesi, New Guinea
 Urceola laevis (Elmer) Merr. - Palawan, Sabah, Sulawesi
 Urceola lakhimpurensis (S.K.Srivast. & Mehrotra) Karthik. & Moorthy - Assam
 Urceola latifolia (Pierre ex Spire) Mabb. - Laos, Thailand, Vietnam 
 Urceola lucida (A.DC.) Benth. ex Kurz - Myanmar, Thailand, W Malaysia, Sumatra
 Urceola malayana Mabb. - Cameron Highlands of W Malaysia
 Urceola micrantha (Wall. ex G.Don) Mabb. - Fujian, Guangdong, Guangxi, Hainan, Sichuan, Taiwan, Tibet, Yunnan, Ryukyu Islands, Assam, Bangladesh, Bhutan, Arunachal Pradesh, Nepal, Cambodia, Laos, Thailand, Vietnam, Myanmar, W Malaysia 
 Urceola minutiflora (Pierre) Mabb. - Cambodia, Laos, Thailand, Vietnam
 Urceola napeensis (Quint.) Mabb. - Laos, Thailand, Vietnam, Guangdong, Guangxi
 Urceola quintaretii (Pierre) Mabb. - Laos, Vietnam, Guangdong, Guangxi
 Urceola rosea (Hook. & Arn.) D.J.Middleton - Cambodia, Laos, Thailand, Vietnam, Laos, W Malaysia, Java, Sumatra, Fujian, Guangdong, Guangxi, Guizhou, Hainan, Hunan, Sichuan, Taiwan, Yunnan 
 Urceola torulosa Hook.f. - W Malaysia, Sumatra, Borneo
 Urceola tournieri (Pierre) Mabb. - Yunnan, Nepal, Bhutan, Assam, Laos, Myanmar, Thailand, Vietnam 
 Urceola xylinabariopsoides (Tsiang) Mabb. - Hainan, Vietnam

References

Apocynaceae genera
Apocyneae